Stenopetalum (common name thread petal) is a genus in the Brassicaceae family which is endemic to Australia. It was first described by Robert Brown in 1821.

Species
There are 11 species in the genus.
Stenopetalum anfractum E.A. Shaw
Stenopetalum decipiens E.A. Shaw
Stenopetalum filifolium Benth.
Stenopetalum lineare R. Br. ex DC.
Stenopetalum nutans F. Muell.
Stenopetalum pedicellare F. Muell. ex Benth.
Stenopetalum robustum Endl.
Stenopetalum salicola Keighery
Stenopetalum saxatile Keighery
Stenopetalum sphaerocarpum F. Muell.
Stenopetalum velutinum F. Muell.

Description
Plants in this genus may be annuals or perennials. They are erect, and may be with or without hairs. The sepals are saccate (shaped like a pouch or sack) and have two forms. The petals are clawed, and drawn out into long narrow apex. There are six stamens. The fruit open at maturity to release the seeds. There are four to twenty mucous seeds in each locule, arranged in two rows.

Etymology
The name Stenopetalum derives from the Greek, ("narrow"), and the Latin, ("petal") and describes plants in the genus as having long, narrow petals.

References

Further reading

External links
Stenopetalum occurrence data from Australasian Virtual Herbarium

Plants described in 1821
Brassicaceae
Taxa named by Robert Brown (botanist, born 1773)
Brassicaceae genera